Ivanjica  (3 May 1972 – 1992) was a French Thoroughbred racehorse and broodmare best known for winning the Prix de l'Arc de Triomphe in 1976.

Background
Ivanjica was bred by her owner Jacques Wertheimer at Claiborne Farm in Paris, Kentucky. She was sired by Epsom Derby winner Sir Ivor and out of the mare Astuce by the important French sire Vieux Manoir. The filly was named for the town of Ivanjica in the Moravica District of Serbia.

Ivanjica was trained by Alec Head and ridden by his son Freddy.

Racing career
In 1975 Ivanjica won the Poule d'Essai des Pouliches and looked likely to start favourite for the Prix de Diane before the race was abandoned owing to industrial action. In autumn she won the Prix Vermeille and finished third to Youth in the Washington, D.C. International Stakes.

In 1976 Ivanjica won the Prix du Prince d'Orange and then capped off her career by giving owner Jacques Wertheimer the first of his two Prix de l'Arc de Triomphe wins.

Stud record
Retired to broodmare service, she produced offspring that had limited success in racing. She died in 1992 after producing six foals.

Ivanjica has the unique distinction of having had her portrait painted by Andy Warhol.

Pedigree

References

1972 racehorse births
1992 racehorse deaths
Racehorses bred in Kentucky
Racehorses trained in France
Arc winners
Thoroughbred family 12-e